Windstopper is a windproof breathable fabric laminate made by W. L. Gore & Associates. One of its most common applications is a lamination with polar fleece, to compensate for fleece's lack of wind resistance. 

Unlike Gore's well-known Gore-Tex laminate, Windstopper is not waterproof.

Use
Many Windstopper garments are marketed as "softshells" suited to high-output aerobic activities such as running, cycling or cross-country skiing.  Because they are not waterproof, they are more breathable than traditional Gore-Tex "hardshell" clothing.  However, because they are based on a solid laminate layer, they remain inherently less breathable than other wind-resistant "softshell" fabrics made by Polartec or Schoeller, which rely on built-in properties of the fabric and weave rather than laminates.

Like most softshell fabrics, Windstopper products are typically coated with DWR (Durable Water Repellent), which provides them with a modest degree of water resistance.  They will wet through in heavy rainfall but can be worn comfortably in light drizzle.

Windstopper is used by a wide variety of manufacturers including Arc'teryx, Patagonia, L.L. Bean, Oakley, Inc., Galvin Green, Marmot, and The North Face.

External links

Technical fabrics
Brand name materials

ru:Политетрафторэтилен#Одежда